Oakgrove School is a coeducational, nursery, primary school, secondary school and sixth form with academy status, located in the Middleton (Oakgrove Secondary) and Oakgrove (Oakgrove Primary & Nursery) districts of south-east Milton Keynes, England. It is the flagship school of the Kingsbridge Educational Trust.

The school originally opened on 1 September 2005, intaking roughly 60 students of both Year 7 and Year 8. In September 2016 the school expanded further to include a primary and nursery school section, for children aged 4 to 11.

Oakgrove Primary & Nursery 
The Primary & Nursery section of Oakgrove School was introduced along with the development of the Oakgrove district. The current headteacher is Mark Sim.

Oakgrove Secondary 
Oakgrove Secondary (originally opened as Oakgrove School) was founded in 2005. From 2005 to 2015 (2014–2015 academic year) the headteacher was Peter Barnes (current executive headteacher of Kingsbridge Educational Trust); however, from 2015 to present, Ian Tett currently holds this position.

Ofsted inspection results 
Oakgrove School has undergone 4 full inspections conducted by Ofsted. Gradings have varied from outstanding to good. The latest full inspection was conducted on 26–27 June 2019.

Notable former pupils
Jeffrey Schlupp, a professional footballer who won the league with Leicester City in 2016, as of 2017 plays for Crystal Palace.
Max Crocombe, professional footballer who is a goalkeeper for Salford City and the New Zealand under-20 national team.

References

External links 
 School website

Educational institutions established in 2005
2005 establishments in England
Secondary schools in Milton Keynes
Academies in Milton Keynes
Primary schools in Milton Keynes